Clifton is a historic home located near Lexington, Rockbridge County, Virginia. The house was built about 1815, and is a two-story, seven bay, Federal style brick dwelling.  It has a side gable roof and four chimneys.  A two-story portico replaced an earlier Victorian portico in the 1980s.  The property includes the contributing small stone servant's quarters or foreman's house and a wooden icehouse.

The address is 205 Old Buena Vista Road.  It was built by Major John Alexander and overlooks the Maury River.  Washington and Lee rowing teams would race at this location in the late 1800s.

It was listed on the National Register of Historic Places in 1994.

References

Houses on the National Register of Historic Places in Virginia
Federal architecture in Virginia
Houses completed in 1815
Houses in Rockbridge County, Virginia
National Register of Historic Places in Rockbridge County, Virginia